Leo Joskowicz from The Hebrew University of Jerusalem, Jerusalem, Israel was named Fellow of the Institute of Electrical and Electronics Engineers (IEEE) in 2013 for contributions to computer assisted surgery and medical image processing.

References

Fellow Members of the IEEE
Living people
Year of birth missing (living people)
Place of birth missing (living people)
Academic staff of the Hebrew University of Jerusalem